The Southern Utah–Weber State football rivalry, known as the Beehive Bowl, is the annual football game between Southern Utah University and Weber State University. Between 1984 and 2006, the schools met 17 times. In 2011, Southern Utah joined the Big Sky Conference, making it a yearly rivalry. On January 14, 2021, the Western Athletic Conference announced that they are reinstating football, with Southern Utah among the teams moving to the WAC. On June 16, 2022, the two schools announced a six-game, home-and-home football series beginning in 2026.

Game results

A FCS playoff game

See also  
 List of NCAA college football rivalry games

References 

Big Sky Conference rivalries
College football rivalries in the United States
Southern Utah Thunderbirds football
Weber State Wildcats football
1984 establishments in Utah